The Victorian Volcanic Plain Grasslands are a critically endangered temperate grasslands that occur in the Australian state of Victoria, stretching from Hamilton in the northwest to the city of Melbourne. Part of the Southern Volcanic Plain and bordering the Gippsland Plains Grassy Woodland to the east, the grasslands sit on Cainozoic volcanic deposits. In 2011, the Victorian Government had reserved 15,000 hectares of land to protect the critically endangered community. Only less than 5% of the pre-European concentration of the grasslands remain.

Geography

The soils in the grassland are susceptible to cracking during drought and being miry in wet periods. Grazing and bushfires have an impact as well. The grasslands also include the Natural Damp Grassland of the Victorian Coastal Plains.

The grasslands were once a large vegetation zone on the volcanic plain, but they have since been reduced to a small, highly divided remnants in a landscape that has been mostly cleared for agriculture. The area is dominated tussock grass alongside wildflowers (which make up 50% of the total landcover), with very few trees and shrubs. The grasslands feature dry warm summers and cool, wet winters.

Biodiversity
In addition to Kangaroo grass, Plume grass, Wallaby-grasses and Spear grasses, the area includes Spiny Rice flower, common tussock grass, Hoary Sunray, Eryngium ovinum, Acaena echinata, Button Wrinklewort, Leptorhynchos squamatus, purple clover, Convolvulus angustissimus, Schoenus apogon and as well as native orchids, lilies, daisies and peas. In wetter places, such as in the west, species that are more prevalent include Microtis unifolia and Drosera peltata. In drier regions, Chrysocephalum apiculatum and Calocephalus citreus are more common.

Native animals include Striped Legless Lizard, Tussock Skink, Common Dunnart, Southern Grass Skink, Eastern Barred Bandicoot, Golden Sun Moth, Growling Grass Frog, eastern grey kangaroo and grassland earless dragon.

References

External links
Victorian Volcanic Plain bioregion
Natural Temperate Grassland of the Victorian Volcanic Plain

Geography of Melbourne
Grasslands of Australia
Remnant urban bushland
Vegetation of Australia
Temperate grasslands, savannas, and shrublands
Environment of Victoria (Australia)
Endangered Ecological Community